The 1928 Denver Pioneers football team was an American football team that represented the University of Denver as a member of the Rocky Mountain Conference (RMC) during the 1928 college football season. In their fourth and final season under head coach Fred Dawson, the Pioneers compiled a 4–4–1 record (3–4–1 against conference opponents), finished seventh in the RMC, and outscored opponents by a total of 128 to 96.

Schedule

References

Denver
Denver Pioneers football seasons
Denver Pioneers football